Psara simillima is a moth in the family Crambidae. It was described by George Hampson in 1913. It is found in Papua New Guinea, where it has been recorded from the D'Entrecasteaux Islands (Fergusson Island).

References

Spilomelinae
Endemic fauna of Papua New Guinea
Moths of Papua New Guinea
D'Entrecasteaux Islands
Moths described in 1913